"Surround Sound" is a song by American rapper JID featuring Atlanta-based rapper 21 Savage and fellow American rapper Baby Tate, released on January 14, 2022 as the lead single from the former's third studio album The Forever Story (2022). Produced by DJ Scheme, Christo, and Nuri, it contains a sample of "One Step Ahead" by Aretha Franklin.

Background
A few days before the song was released, JID previewed the music video on Instagram. In a later post, he revealed the inspiration behind the song was from focusing on the environmental sounds and noises around him as a child, to find an escape from his chaotic home life.

Composition
In the beginning of the song, a sample of "One Step Ahead" by Aretha Franklin is played and a loop built around it serves as the instrumental. JID raps the chorus and first verse with double entendres and multisyllabic rhymes. The second verse is rapped by 21 Savage, who "mixes gun talk with making sound financial decisions". Near the first half of the song, Baby Tate provides "fluttering vocals" in R&B style closing out of the first part. The beat then switches to a "woozy, bass-bombed wobble that artfully weaves in elements from the song's first half". During the second half of the song, JID returns with another verse, which has a darker approach and has been described as "cut-throat".

Critical reception
The song received generally positive reviews from critics. Tom Breihan of Stereogum wrote that the song "makes it clear, once again, that J.I.D is a masterful technical rapper who can also write a serious hook." Chris DeVille of Stereogum wrote, "As for the track's leading man, he's switching up flows like it's nothing and toying with the English language on a level most rappers can't approach." Deville also noted JID's "marvelous flurry of syllables" and "sketching out a whole mural's worth of imagery in a single sentence fragment". DeVille praised 21 Savage's verse as well, writing that he "once again shows off his mastery of this kind of soul loop" and comparing it to his song "A Lot".

Music video
The official music video was released alongside the single. Directed by Mac Grant and Chad Tennies, the video opens with JID going into an older model vehicle. He starts rapping as he is driving, with women in the passenger seats of the car. In a garage, he raps while surrounded by women, and is seen atop a car. 21 Savage performs his verse standing next to JID. Baby Tate sings while lying on top of a car. When the beat switches, the video transitions to black and white. The scene changes to that of an "eerie" house, where JID raps the last verse. Multiple clones of him are also seen in the house.

Charts

Certifications

References

2022 singles
2022 songs
JID songs
21 Savage songs
Baby Tate (rapper) songs
Songs written by JID
Songs written by 21 Savage
Songs written by Baby Tate (rapper)
Dreamville Records singles
Interscope Records singles